Florida Championship Wrestling (FCW) was a professional wrestling promotion based on the former National Wrestling Alliance member promotion, Championship Wrestling from Florida, which operated from 1961 until 1987. From October 2007 to August 2012, the promotion served as the official developmental territory for WWE. In August 2012, WWE re-branded Florida Championship Wrestling into NXT for their developmental territory, with storylines and championships being discontinued.

In March 2020 a documentary was released on WWE Network titled A Future WWE: The FCW Story, about the professional wrestlers that came up through the FCW system.

History
The promotion was started by Steve Keirn in 2007 and became WWE's second developmental territory when they ended their relationship with the Georgia-based Deep South Wrestling in April 2007. It became their sole developmental territory in early 2008 when they ceased affiliation with Ohio Valley Wrestling.

FCW's debut show was on June 26, 2007 at Tampa, Florida's Dallas Bull. A 21-man Battle Royal was held during the show, to crown the first ever FCW Southern Heavyweight Champion. The next year, the Florida Heavyweight Championship was introduced, with Jake Hager becoming the first champion at a February 15 show after surviving a Battle Royal and defeating Ted DiBiase, Jr. The Florida Tag Team Championship was also introduced in February, with the Puerto Rican Nightmares (Eddie Colón and Eric Pérez) beating Steven Lewington and Heath Miller to win it in the finals of a one night tournament. The singles titles were later unified, keeping the "Florida Heavyweight" name and championship.

On July 7, 2008, WWE confirmed that FCW was based on the original independent Championship Wrestling from Florida promotion, which operated from 1961 until 1987.  The program's ending consisted of various clips from the ending of CWF's programs, featuring Gordon Solie's classic sign-off line "So long from the Sunshine State", accompanied by Solie winking one of his eyes and waving two fingers upward.

On July 17, 2008, the FCW Arena was officially opened, and included a taping of the debut episode of FCW TV.

On March 20, 2012, it was reported that WWE would cease operation at Florida Championship Wrestling; however, this statement was later refuted after Steve Keirn denied the claim. WWE Executive Vice President of Talent and Live Events, Triple H, stated WWE will be ramping up their development system, not shutting it down.

In August 2012, WWE dropped the FCW name, deactivated the titles, and began running all of its developmental events and operations under the "NXT Wrestling" banner. WWE had been using the NXT name for a television program featuring rookies from FCW competing to become WWE main roster wrestlers, though the reality television aspects of the show had been dropped earlier in 2012; WWE NXT now serves as the primary television program for the NXT Wrestling promotion.

Championships and accomplishments

Notable alumni

The following is a list of notable FCW alumni that were called to the main roster of WWE.

References

 
WWE
2007 establishments in Florida
2012 disestablishments in Florida
Companies based in Tampa, Florida